In algebraic geometry, a quotient stack is a stack that parametrizes equivariant objects. Geometrically, it generalizes a quotient of a scheme or a variety by a group: a quotient variety, say, would be a coarse approximation of a quotient stack.

The notion is of fundamental importance in the study of stacks: a stack that arises in nature is often either a quotient stack itself or admits a stratification by quotient stacks (e.g., a Deligne–Mumford stack.) A quotient stack is also used to construct other stacks like classifying stacks.

Definition 
A quotient stack is defined as follows. Let G be an affine smooth group scheme over a scheme S and X an S-scheme on which G acts. Let the quotient stack  be the category over the category of S-schemes:
an object over T is a principal G-bundle  together with equivariant map ;

Suppose the quotient  exists as an algebraic space (for example, by the Keel–Mori theorem). The canonical map
,
that sends a bundle P over T to a corresponding T-point, need not be an isomorphism of stacks; that is, the space "X/G" is usually coarser. The canonical map is an isomorphism if and only if the stabilizers are trivial (in which case  exists.)

In general,  is an Artin stack (also called algebraic stack). If the stabilizers of the geometric points are finite and reduced, then it is a Deligne–Mumford stack. 

 has shown: let X be a normal Noetherian algebraic stack whose stabilizer groups at closed points are affine. Then X is a quotient stack if and only if it has the resolution property; i.e., every coherent sheaf is a quotient of a vector bundle. Earlier, Robert Wayne Thomason proved that a quotient stack has the resolution property.

Examples 
An effective quotient orbifold, e.g.,  where the  action has only finite stabilizers on the smooth space , is an example of a quotient stack.

Borel's theorem describes the cohomology ring of the classifying stack.

Moduli of line bundles 
For any scheme (or -scheme) , the -points of the moduli stack are the groupoid of principal -bundles .

Moduli of line bundles with n-sections 
This follows directly from the definition of quotient stacks evaluated on points. This can be found by noting giving a -equivariant map  and restricting it to the fiber  gives the same data as a section  of the bundle. This construction then globalizes by gluing affine charts together, giving a global section of the bundle.

Moduli of formal group laws 

Example: Let L be the Lazard ring; i.e., . Then the quotient stack  by 
,
,

See also 
Homotopy quotient
Moduli stack of principal bundles (which, roughly, is an infinite product of classifying stacks.)
Group-scheme action
Moduli of algebraic curves

References 

Some other references are

Algebraic geometry